Adelina Viktoria Engman (born 11 October 1994) is a Finnish professional footballer who plays as a forward for Hammarby IF and the Finland national team.

Club career
Engman made her debut for Åland United in NIG 2009. In 2015, she moved to Sweden to sign for Damallsvenskan club Kopparbergs/Göteborg FC.

On June 29 2018, it was announced that Engman would be leaving Kopparbergs/Göteborg FC after three years, to join Chelsea F.C. Women in the upcoming July transfer window.

On 25 November 2021, Engman signed a two-year contract with Hammarby IF.

International career
In May 2012, Engman made her debut for the senior Finland national team in a match against Belgium.

International goals
''Scores and results list Finland's goal tally first:

Honours 
Åland United
Winner
 Naisten Liiga (2): 2009, 2013

Runners-up
 Naisten Liiga (2): 2012, 2014
Chelsea
Winner
 FA Women's League Cup 2020
FA Women's Super League 2019-2020

References

External links 
 
 
 
 
 
 Adelina Engman at SPL 

1994 births
Living people
Women's association football forwards
Finnish women's footballers
Finnish expatriate footballers
Finnish expatriate sportspeople in England
Expatriate women's footballers in Sweden
Expatriate women's footballers in England
Damallsvenskan players
Finland women's international footballers
BK Häcken FF players
Kansallinen Liiga players
Finnish expatriate sportspeople in Sweden
Åland United players
Chelsea F.C. Women players
Hammarby Fotboll (women) players
Women's Super League players
People from Mariehamn
Sportspeople from Åland
UEFA Women's Euro 2022 players